Self-publishing is the publication of media (e.g. books, music, art) by its author at their own cost, without the involvement of a publisher.  However, the author may engage professionals or companies to assist with various aspects of publication, distribution or marketing.  This page lists the best-known of such companies.  It is not an exhaustive list.

Assisted Self-publishing 
Assisted self-publishing companies offer services such as editing, proof-reading, cover design, formatting, printing, cover design, marketing and promotion.  They may offer these services separately or as a package. They do not take any rights from the author and the author retains total control of the work and decisions relating to it.  

 Blurb, Inc.
 CreateSpace
 Darkside communication group
 DiggyPOD
 FastPencil
 FriesenPress
 Greyden Press
 Lightning Source
 Llumina Press
 Lulu
 Notion Press
 Self Publish, Be Happy
 Wattpad

Self-publishing e-book platforms 

 Amazon's Kindle Direct Publishing
 Apple's App Store (iOS)
 Barnes & Noble
 Blurb, Inc.
 Kobo Writing Life
 Lulu
 Powell's Books
 Scribd
 Smashwords
 Wattpad

E-book digital distribution platforms 

 Amazon Kindle
 Archive of Our Own
 Barnes & Noble Nook
 FanFiction.Net (aka Fiction Press)
 Google Play Books
 Hoopla Digital
 iBooks Store
 Kindle Direct Publishing
 Kindle Store
 Kobo
 Lulu.com
 NoiseTrade
 OverDrive, Inc.
 PocketBook Reader
 Scribd
 Smashwords
 Wattpad
 Wikibooks

Discontinued 

 Sony Reader
 Oyster
  Pronoun

Print on demand books 

 BiblioBazaar
 Books LLC
 DiggyPOD
 Lightning Source
 Llumina Press
 Lulu
 Powell's Books

Self-printing products and custom merchandise 

 Cafe Press
 CustomInk
 Redbubble
 Shopify
 Shutterfly
 Spreadshirt
 Teespring
 Vistaprint
 Zazzle

See also 

 Amateur press association
 Article processing charge
 Author mill
 Custom media
 Dōjin
 Fan fiction
 Fanzine
 Independent music
 Mimeo Revolution
 Predatory open access publishing
 Print on demand
 Samizdat
 Self Publish, Be Happy
 Self publishing
 Small press
 Vanity award
 Vanity press or vanity publishing

References 

DIY culture
Self Publishing
Self-publishing
Self-publishing companies
Self-publishing online stores